Symplectrodia is a genus of Australian plants in the grass family.

 Species
 Symplectrodia gracilis Lazarides - Northern Territory
 Symplectrodia lanosa Lazarides - Northern Territory

References

Poaceae genera
Endemic flora of Australia
Chloridoideae